Grad is an Old Slavic word meaning "town", "city", "castle" or "fortified settlement". Initially present in all related languages as gord, it can still be found as grad, gradić, horod or gorod in many placenames today.
 
These places have grad as part of their name:
 Asenovgrad ("Asen's town")
 Beograd ("white town"), capital of Serbia, known in English as Belgrade. The largest city with grad in its name (in the 21st century).
 Biograd ("white town")
 Blagoevgrad ("Blagoev's town")
 Danilovgrad ("Danilo's town")
 Dimitrovgrad ("Dimitrov's town")
 Donji Grad ("lower town")
 Dravograd ("Drava town")
 Filmski Grad ("film town")
 Golem Grad
 Gornji Grad ("upper town")
 Grad, Slovenia
 Gradac ("small town")
 Gradec ("small town/castle")
 Gradina ("large town/castle")
 Gradinje
 Gradišče ("town-place/castle-place")
 Gradsko ("of the town")
 Gródek ("small town/castle")
 Grodzisk ("town-place/castle-place")
 Grodzisko ("town-place/castle-place")
 Grodziszcze ("town-place/castle-place")
 Ivaylovgrad ("Ivaylo's town")
 Kaliningrad ("Kalinin's town")
 Kirovgrad ("Kirov's town")
 Leningrad ("Lenin's town")
 Moigrad ("my city")
 Mrkonjić Grad ("Mrkonjić's town")
 Novgorod ("new town")
 Novi Grad ("new town")
 Novigrad ("new town")
 Nowogród ("new town")
 Nowogród, Poland ("new town")
 Nowy Gródek ("new small town")
 Petrograd ("Peter's town")
 Petrovgrad ("Peter's town")
 Podgrad ("below the town/castle")
 Pogradec ("below the small town")
 Razgrad ("Hors' town")
 Stalingrad ("Stalin's town")
 Stari Grad ("old town")
 Starigrad ("old town")
 Tarigrad, Moldova ("king's town") 
 Titograd ("Tito's town")
 Tomislavgrad ("Tomislav's town")
 Topolovgrad ("poplar town")
 Velehrad, Czech Republic
 Veliko Gradište ("large town-place")
 Velingrad ("Vela's town")
 Vinograd, Bulgaria
 Vinogradovca, Moldova
 Visegrad ("upper town")
 Volgograd ("Volga town")
 Voroshilovgrad ("Voroshilov's town"), in honour of Soviet military commander Kliment Voroshilov.
 Yekaterinograd ("Catherine's town")
 Zlatograd ("gold town")

References

Slavic toponyms